Calyptra pseudobicolor is a moth of the family Erebidae. It is found in India. It has been known to feed on humans, as well as a variety of other mammals.

References

Calpinae
Moths of Asia
Moths described in 1979